Luciana Milagros León Romero (born 30 June 1978) is a Peruvian politician (APRA). She is the daughter of Rómulo León Alegría, a well known politician in Peru.

Education
Luciana León holds a law degree from the University of Lima and a Master of Governance and Public Policy from the University of San Martín de Porres.

Political career 
In February 1993, at the age of 14, she became General Secretary of the Aprista Party's youth wing, serving until 1995. In 2002, she was an advisor to the Women's commission of the Congress, subsequently advisor to the Vice President of Congress, her mentor Mercedes Cabanillas until 2003. From 2004 to 2005, she was advisor to the general direction of the Ministry of Transportation and Communications. In 2006, León was elected Congresswoman representing Lima and being the youngest representative in the 2006–2011 term. In the 2011 election, she was re-elected for another five-year term as one of only four Aprista lawmakers left.

She testified during the investigation of the 2008 Peru oil scandal after her name came up in e-mails indicating she was involved in the scandal.

Awards and recognition
She has been named #1 in an international Internet poll, run by Spain's 20 Minutos newspaper in 2009 to find the world's most beautiful female politician.

See also 
 Alan García
 2008 Peru oil scandal

References

External links

Official Congressional Site
Luciana Leon's official site
Resume on the National Electoral Panel (JNE) site

Living people
Peruvian people of Spanish descent
American Popular Revolutionary Alliance politicians
Members of the Congress of the Republic of Peru
1978 births
University of Lima alumni
21st-century Peruvian women politicians
21st-century Peruvian politicians
Women members of the Congress of the Republic of Peru